The Jamaica Division of the North America and West Indies Station was a sub-command of the British Royal Navy's North America and West Indies Station head-quartered at Port Royal  dockyard in Jamaica from 1838 to 1905.

History
In 1830 The Jamaica Station merged with the North American Station to form the North America and West Indies Station. In 1838 the Royal Navy established a sub-command to the Commander-in-Chief, North America and West Indies Station. It was commanded by the Commodore on Jamaica Division of North America and West Indies Station who was responsible for the naval base until March 1905 when the dockyard was closed. In 1951, the Royal Naval Dockyard, Bermuda closed after which the new post of Senior Naval Officer, West Indies (SNOWI) was established as the West Indies Sub-Area Command under the Commander-in-Chief, Home Fleet. The office holder would hold the rank of Commodore.

The division primarily consisted of naval vessels assigned to this command but also included the shore establishment Jamaica Dockyard.

Commodores on Jamaica Division
Post holders included:

References

Royal Navy divisions